The 1975–76 Cincinnati Stingers season was the Stingers' first season of operation in the World Hockey Association (WHA).

Offseason

Regular season

Final standings

Game log

Playoffs

Player stats

Awards and records

Transactions

Roster

Draft picks
Cincinnati's draft picks at the 1975 WHA Amateur Draft.

Farm teams

See also
1975–76 WHA season

References

External links

Cincinnati Stingers seasons
Cinc
Cinc